Francesco Maria Tarugi, C.O. (French: François-Marie Tarugi) (1525 – 11 June, 1608) was a Roman Catholic cardinal.

Biography
He arrived to Rome in 1555, and there joined the oratory of St Philip Neri. In 1571, at age 45, he decided to become a priest with the Oratorians. In 1586, Tarugi moved to Naples, where he assisted in the foundation of the Oratory there. In 1592, he was appointed to the See of Avignon, where he worked to implement the reforms of the Council of Trent. On 21 Dec 1592, he was consecrated bishop by Alessandro Ottaviano de' Medici, Archbishop of Florence. Tarugi was created Cardinal in 1596, and the following year was appointed Archbishop of Siena. Pope Paul V granted Tarugi permission to return to the Roman Oratory towards the end of his life.

While bishop, he was the principal co-consecrator of Pietro Aldobrandini, Archbishop of Ravenna (1604).

References

1525 births
1608 deaths
People from Montepulciano
17th-century Italian cardinals
Oratorian bishops
16th-century Italian cardinals
Archbishops of Avignon